Mats Johan Edward Bångsbo (born 10 February 2003) is a Swedish footballer who plays for IFK Göteborg as a defender.

References

External links 
 

2003 births
Living people
Swedish footballers
IFK Göteborg players
Association football defenders